Secusigiu is a commune in Arad County, Romania, is situated in the north-western part of the Vingăi Plateau and it occupies 17202 ha. It is composed of four villages: Munar (Munár), Satu Mare (Temesnagyfalu), Sânpetru German (Németszentpéter) and Secusigiu (situated at 31 km from Arad).

Population
According to the 2002 census the population of the commune counts 5838 inhabitants, out of which 82.4% are Romanians,
7.0% Hungarians, 5.0% Roma, 1.4% Germans, 3.6% Ukrainians and 0.6% are of other or undeclared nationalities.

History
The first documentary record of Secusigiu dates back to 1359. Munar was attested documentarily in 1219, Satu Mare  in 1333, while Sânpetru German in 1335.

Tourism
The Natural park "Lunca Mureșului", the reservation called
"Prundul Mare", the church built in 1529, the Serb monastery situated on the bank of the Mureș River, 4 km from Munar, the church demolished by the Turks and rebuilt between 1776–1781 in Baroque style, the lake with white water-lily close to the monastery, the boundary-stones in Munar, the Roman Catholic Church built in 1774 and Saint Peter's Statue put up in the centre of Sânpetru German are the most important sights of the commune.

Economy 
The economy is mostly based on agriculture, most notably on Corn, Wheat, Sunflower, Tomatoes, and Melon crops while the industry is based on manufacturing goods.

Education 
Currently in the commune there are 5 schools and 4 kindergartens, The newest kindergarten was built in 2019.

References

Communes in Arad County
Localities in Romanian Banat